The Shire of Denmark is a local government area in the Great Southern region of Western Australia, about  west of Albany and about  south-southeast of the state capital, Perth.

History
The Denmark Road District was gazetted on 22 September 1911. On 1 July 1961, the district became a shire following the passing of the Local Government Act 1960, which reformed all remaining road districts into shires.

Wards
The Shire of Denmark is divided into three wards with a varying number of councillors:

 Scotsdale/Shadforth Ward (four councillors)
 Town Ward (three councillors)
 Kent/Nornalup Ward (two councillors)

Townsites
 Denmark (extended to include residential portions of Ocean Beach on 5 July 2016)
 Nornalup (created on 5 July 2016)
 Peaceful Bay (created on 5 July 2016)

Towns and localities
The towns and localities of the Shire of Denmark with population and size figures based on the most recent Australian census:

Heritage-listed places

As of 2023, 141 places are heritage-listed in the Shire of Denmark, of which three are on the State Register of Heritage Places.

References

External links
 

Denmark